Eduardo Díaz del Río (born 17 December 1973) is a Chilean politician and lawyer.

On 6 December 2021, he was among the figures which announced his vote for José Antonio Kast in the ballotage of the 2021 Chilean general election.

Political career

Controversies
On 27 July 2012, his former wife accused him of mistreating and taking his children from him.

References

External links
 BCN Profile

1973 births
Living people
20th-century Chilean lawyers
Pontifical Catholic University of Chile alumni
Party of the South (Chile) politicians
Independent Democratic Union politicians
Christian Democratic Party (Chile) politicians
Independent Regionalist Party politicians
Amplitude (political party) politicians